The 2019 Sedgemoor District Council election took place on Thursday 2 May 2019 as a four-yearly election to elect all members (councillors) of Sedgemoor District Council in the English county of Somerset. The principal town in the district is Bridgwater accounting for 15 of the 48 councillors elected. The election was part of the United Kingdom local elections, 2019. Following the election, Sedgemoor District Council became the only district council in Somerset still under Conservative control.

Results

|}

Ward Results
* seeking re-election

Axevale

Berrow

Bridgwater Dunwear

Bridgwater Eastover

Bridgwater Fairfax

Bridgwater Hamp

Bridgwater Victoria

Bridgwater Westover

Bridgwater Wyndham

Burnham Central

Burnham North

Cannington and Wembdon

Cheddar and Shipham

East Poldens

Highbridge and Burnham Marine

Huntspill and Pawlett

Kings Isle

Knoll

North Petherton

Puriton and Woolavington

Quantocks

Wedmore and Mark

West Poldens

References 

2019 English local elections
May 2019 events in the United Kingdom
2019
2010s in Somerset